...aus dem Bauch (...from the Belly) is the second studio album by German recording artist Max Mutzke. It was released by Rare Records and Warner Music Group on 8 June 2007 in German-speaking Europe.

Track listing

Charts

Release history

References

References
MaxMutzke.de — Official website

2007 albums
Max Mutzke albums
German-language albums